John Aston Jr. (born 28 June 1947) is an English former professional footballer who played in the Football League for Manchester United, Luton Town, Mansfield Town and Blackburn Rovers.

Aston was a forward who rose through the Manchester United youth system. His debut for the club came in 1965 against Leicester City. He went on to help the club win the 1967 League championship as well as the 1968 European Cup, where he provided a man of the match performance in the final against Benfica at Wembley Stadium on 29 May 1968. Aston scored 27 goals in 187 appearances before leaving the club in 1972 for Luton Town, later playing for Mansfield Town and Blackburn Rovers.

His father, John Aston Sr., also played for Manchester United in the immediate post-Second World War years, and was a coach at United during his son's playing career.

After retiring, Aston now runs a pet stall in Glossop, High Peak, Derbyshire.

Honours

Club 
Manchester United
First Division
Winner: 1966–67
Charity Shield
Winner (2): 1965*, 1967* (*=shared)
European Cup
Winner: 1967–68
Intercontinental Cup
Runner-up: 1968

Individual 
1968 European Cup Final Man of the Match

References

1947 births
Living people
Footballers from Manchester
English footballers
England under-23 international footballers
Luton Town F.C. players
Manchester United F.C. players
Mansfield Town F.C. players
Blackburn Rovers F.C. players
Association football wingers
English Football League players
UEFA Champions League winning players